Alba Regia is the Latin name of the Hungarian city of Székesfehérvár.

Alba Regia may also refer to:
 Alba Regia (car), Hungarian microcar project of the 1950s 
 111468 Alba Regia, main-belt asteroid 
 Alba Regia (film), a 1961 Hungarian film